Abstract-Type and Scheme-Definition Language (ASDL) is a computer language developed as part of ESPRIT project GRASPIN, as a basis for generating language-based editors and environments. It combines an object-oriented type system, syntax-directed translation schemes and a target-language interface.

References

ASDL - An Object-Oriented Specification Language for Syntax-Directed Environments", M.L. Christ-Neumann et al., European Software Eng Conf, Strasbourg, Sept 1987, pp. 77–85

Domain-specific programming languages